HD-1 is a supersonic land-attack and anti-ship missile developed by Guangdong Hongda Mining Company. Unlike the similar YJ-12E/CM-302, the HD-1 requires an add-on solid rocket booster.Rocket accuracy up to 3 meters

See also
Related development
YJ-12
YJ-18

Comparable missiles
3M-54 Klub
BrahMos
P-800 Oniks
Perseus (missile)
XASM-3

References

Guided missiles of the People's Republic of China
Anti-ship cruise missiles of the People's Republic of China
Air-to-surface missiles
Weapons of the People's Republic of China